Bohdan Serhiyovych Nikishyn (born 29 May 1980) is a Ukrainian right-handed épée fencer, 2015 team world champion, and three-time Olympian.

Nikishyn competed in the 2004 Athens Olympic Games, the 2008 Beijing Olympic Games, and the 2016 Rio de Janeiro Olympic Games.

Nikishyn won a bronze medal in the team men's épée event at the 2006 World Fencing Championships in Turin, Italy, a silver medal in the team men's épée event at the 2013 World Fencing Championships in Budapest, Hungary, a gold medal in the team men's épée event at the 2015 World Fencing Championships in Moscow, Russia, a bronze medal in the individual men's épée event at the 2018 World Fencing Championships in Wuxi, China, and a silver medal in the team men's épée event at the 2019 World Fencing Championships in Budapest, Hungary.

Nikishyn won a bronze medal in the individual men's épée event at the 2016 European Fencing Championships in Toruń, Poland, and a bronze medal in the individual men's épée event at the 2018 European Fencing Championships in Novi Sad, Serbia.

Between 2006 and 2019, Nikishyn won two FIE Men's Épée Grand Prix titles, in addition to two silver medals and four bronze medals.

Between 2008 and 2020, Nikishyn won four FIE Men's Épée World Cup titles, in addition to four silver medals and three bronze medals.

Career
Nikishyn took up fencing at the age of ten after he came by chance to a fencing training. He won a team silver medal at the 1998 Junior World Championships in Keszthely and joined the senior national team for the 2001 World Championships in Nîmes. He took part in the 2004 Summer Olympics, but was eliminated in the preliminary round by Romania's Alexandru Nyisztor. In the team event Ukraine was defeated in the first round by Hungary and finished 5th after the placement rounds.

Nikishyn was excluded from the national team in the 2004–05 season, but he was reinstated the next season. He achieved his first World Cup podium with a bronze medal in the Doha Grand Prix. At the 2006 World Championships in Turin he was eliminated in the qualifications phase of the individual event. In the team event Nikishyn, Dmytro Karyuchenko, Maksym Khvorost and Dmytro Chumak were defeated in the semi-finals, then overcame Hungary to earn Ukraine's first world medal in team épée.

At his second Olympics, Beijing 2008, Nikishyn was stopped in the second round by Switzerland's Michael Kauter. In the team event Ukraine was defeated in the first round by Poland and finished 7th.

At the 2013 World Championships in Budapest Nikishyn lost in the first round to Spain's José Luis Abajo. In the team event Ukraine defeated Russia in the round of 16. After that they defeated the Czech Republic and France to meet Hungary in the final. Hungary won scoring 42–38 and Ukraine took a silver medal, the best result in Ukrainian history for men's team épée.

In the 2012–13 season Nikishyn won the Heidenheim Grand Prix and earned a silver medal in the Berne Grand Prix, which allowed him to enter the Top 10 for the first time in his career. In the next season he reached the final in the Doha Grand Prix, where he was defeated by Korea's Park Sang-young, but then he won the Heidenheim Grand Prix and the Buenos Aires Grand Prix. He made his way to the quarter-finals of the 2014 World Championships in Kazan, where he lost to Korea's Park Kyoung-doo. He finished the season as No.2 in world rankings.

The 2014–15 season was more difficult with only a quarter-finals finish at the Heidenheimer Pokal. At the European Championships in Montreux he lost in the round of 16 to France's Ronan Gustin. The Ukrainian team lost to world No.1 France in the semifinals, then to hosts Switzerland and finished fourth. At the World Championships in Moscow, Nikishyn was eliminated again in the round of 16, losing to the eventual world champion Géza Imre. In the team event, Ukraine defeated Cuba, then Spain. They had a tight 34–33 victory over hosts Russia in the quarter-finals, then prevailed in the semi-final against Italy after a semi-final was marked by several non-combativity calls, which finished on the low score of 15–11. Passivity was also used on both sides in the final against South Korea. Nikishyn entered the match last when the score was 11–7 and, defending against Jung Seung-hwa's attacks, finished on 34–24, allowing Ukraine to win their first world title in men's fencing.

In 2016 he won the bronze medal at the European Championships in the team and in the individual championships. In personal Bogdan defeated such rivals as: Bartosz Pisetsky (15:6), Gabor Boczko (10:9), Paolo Pizzo (15:6) and Géza Imre (15:11). Nikishin lost in the semifinals to the future winner - Yannick Borel (8:15).

Medal Record

World Championship

European Championship

Grand Prix

World Cup

Personal life
Nikishyn was educated at the Prydniprovska State Academy of Civil Engineering and Architecture in Dnipropetrovsk. He is married and has two children: Anastasia and Maksym.

References

External links

Profile at the European Fencing Confederation

1980 births
Living people
Ukrainian male épée fencers
Fencers at the 2004 Summer Olympics
Fencers at the 2008 Summer Olympics
Fencers at the 2016 Summer Olympics
Olympic fencers of Ukraine
Sportspeople from Dnipro
European Games competitors for Ukraine
Fencers at the 2015 European Games
World Fencing Championships medalists
Fencers at the 2020 Summer Olympics